2008 State Basketball League season may refer to:

2008 MSBL season, Men's SBL season
2008 WSBL season, Women's SBL season